Anthonia Kleinhoonte (1887–1960) was a Dutch botanist and experimentalist best known for her study of the circadian rhythms of plants. She created a device that measured jack bean (Canavalia ensiformis) leaf movements.  She identified at least 50 plant species.

References 

1887 births
1960 deaths
Dutch women scientists
20th-century Dutch botanists
20th-century Dutch women scientists